Diana De Brito, known by her stage name IAMDDB, is an Angolan rapper and singer based in Manchester, United Kingdom. IAMDDB has released three EPs and three mixtapes as of 2021 and was listed number three on BBC Sound of 2018.

Life and career 
De Brito was born in Lisbon, Portugal and moved to Manchester, United Kingdom at the age of five or six. She is of Angolan and Portuguese ancestry.

She released the Hoodrich, Vol. 3 mixtape in 2017 and Flightmode, Vol. 4 in 2018.

IAMDDB was a supporting musician for Lauryn Hill's UK tour in late 2018. Her latest album is 2019's Swervvvvv.5.

IAMDDB made an announcement via twitter that she will be releasing a Vol. 6 in 2023.

Discography

Extended plays 
 Waeveybby, Vol. 1 (2016)
 Vibe, Volume 2. (2017)
 Kare Package (2019)

Mixtapes 
 Hoodrich, Vol. 3 (2017)
 Flightmode, Vol. 4 (2018)
 Swervvvvv.5 (2019)

Singles 
 "JAZB (Flying Lotus)" (2016)
 "Selfless" (2016)
 "Leaned Out"  (2016)
 "Shade" (2017)
 "Drippy" (2018)
 "Wokeuptoflexxx (WUTF)" (2019)
 "Night Kapp" (2019)
 "Famous" (2019)
 "Kare Package" (2019)
 "God's Work" (featuring iLL BLU) (2020)
 "Quarantine" (2020)
 "End of the World" (2020)
 "Wa'hum" (2020)
 "Silver Lines" (2021)
 "JGL" (2021)
 "F***KED UPPP" (2022)
 "WHERE DID THE LOVE GO?" (2023)

Collaborations 
 Earth Tones EP by Lenzman (2017)
 We Could EP by Graeme S (2017)
 "You Don't Know Me"
 "Taking My Time [Explicit]"
 Jagged Tooth Crook EP by The Mouse Outfit (2018)
 "Mira Mira" (from Europa EP) by Diplo (2019)

Show Appearances 

 Jungle (2022)

References

External links 
 
 IAMDDB Website

Year of birth missing (living people)
Living people
Musicians from Lisbon
Rappers from Manchester
English women rappers
English women singer-songwriters
Portuguese rappers
Portuguese women singer-songwriters
Portuguese singer-songwriters
English people of Angolan descent
English people of Portuguese descent
Portuguese people of Angolan descent
Portuguese emigrants to the United Kingdom